Peter Wilfred Woodman (b December 1936) is a retired         Anglican priest.

Woodman was educated at St David's College, Lampeter and Wycliffe Hall Oxford. He was ordained deacon in 1960 and priest in 1961. After curacies in New Tredegar, Newport and Llanfrechfa he was Archbishop's Messenger for Edwin Morris. He was Vicar of Llantilio Pertholey from 1967 to 1974; of Bassaleg from 1974 to 1990; and Caerwent from 1990 to 1996. He was Archdeacon of Monmouth from 1993  to 2001. As archdeacon Woodman worked closely with Bishop Rowan Williams, later the Archbishop of Canterbury.

References

1936 births
20th-century Welsh Anglican priests
21st-century Welsh Anglican priests
Living people
Archdeacons of Monmouth
Alumni of the University of Wales, Lampeter
Alumni of Wycliffe Hall, Oxford